The Forty-fourth Oregon Legislative Assembly convened in 1947 for its regular biennial session, from January 13 to April 5, at the Oregon State Capitol in Salem. Republicans held overwhelming majorities over the Democrats in both the Senate (25–5) and the House of Representatives (58–2). The body held no special sessions. The Senate President was Marshall E. Cornett (R–17 Klamath Falls) and the Speaker of the House was John Hubert Hall (R–5 Portland).

On , Cornett died in a plane crash near Lakeview, Oregon, along with governor Earl Snell and secretary of state Robert S. Farrell, Jr. Because the House speaker is in the gubernatorial line of succession after the secretary of state and Senate president, Hall ascended to the governorship and completed Snell's term.

See also 
 Oregon State Senate
 Government of Oregon

References 

Oregon legislative sessions
1947 in Oregon
1947 U.S. legislative sessions
1948 in Oregon
1948 U.S. legislative sessions